Nadia Mariel di Cello (born January 20, 1989) is an Argentine actress who was born in Argentina and raised and developed her career in Argentina.

Biography 
Nadia Mariel di Cello was born on January 20, 1989, in Argentina. She has an older sister named Natalia di Cello.

Career 
Nadia di Cello, debuted as an actress in 1996 at age 7 in  Chiquititas, being together with Camila Bordonaba the actresses that lasted the longest in the cast. Between 1996 and 2001, she made the theatrical seasons of Chiquititas. In 2001, she was summoned by Cris Morena for the special Chiquititas de Oro where she and the most prominent of all seasons came together to receive the award Chiquititas de Oro. In 2001, she was part of the cast of the film Chiquititas: Rincón de luz. In 2001, she made a special appearance with Sebastián Francini in the television program Poné a Francella. In 2002, she made a special appearance in the youth series Rebelde Way starring Camila Bordonaba, Felipe Colombo, Luisana Lopilato and Benjamín Rojas, where she played Florencia Fernández, the sister of Luna Fernández, a disabled girl whom her mother isolates. In 2003, she was part of the cast of the children's series Rincón de Luz starring Guido Kaczka and Soledad Pastorutti. Between 2003 and 2004, she made the theatrical seasons of Rincón de Luz. In 2006, she was part of the cast of the youth telenovela El Refugio de los Sueños. In 2015, she performed the play La vida prestada. In 2016, she performed the play Princesas rotas. In 2017, she was part of the cast of the miniseries Santos pecadores starring Daniela Cardone and Nazarena Vélez. In 2018, she was part of the cast of the film Huellas. In 2019, she performed the play Amoricia. In 2019, she starred in the play Casa Duarte.

Personal life 
On May 24, 2019, she married, Fernando Migliano in a civil ceremony. In 2010 she gave birth to the couple's first child, a boy, whom they called Valentino Migliano. On December 10, 2015, she gave birth to the couple's second child, a girl, whom they called Francesca Migliano. Nadia di Cello is a supporter of football club Boca Juniors. She has named Toy Story as her favourite film, Aaron Carter her idol and Shakira her favourite singer.

Filmography

Television

Television Programs

Theater

Movies

Discography

Soundtrack albums

 1996 — Chiquititas Vol. 2
 1997 — Chiquititas Vol. 3
 1998  — Chiquititas Vol. 4
 1999 —  Chiquititas Vol. 5
 2000 — Chiquititas Vol. 6
 2001 — Chiquititas Vol. 7
 2001 — Chiquititas: Rincón de Luz
 2003 — Rincón de Luz

References

External links
 
 

1989 births
Living people
21st-century Argentine women singers
Argentine film actresses
Argentine stage actresses
Argentine television actresses
Singers from Buenos Aires
Mexican people of Italian descent
Mexican emigrants to Argentina
Naturalized citizens of Argentina
Argentine people of Italian descent